Barlby with Osgodby is a civil parish in the Selby district of North Yorkshire, England, just to the north of Selby.

The parish covers Barlby and Osgodby and had a population of 4,533 according to the 2001 census, increasing to 4,974 at the 2011 Census.

References

Civil parishes in North Yorkshire
Selby District